Karreh Shahbazi (also Romanized as Karreh Shahbāzī; also known as Cheshmeh Belqīs, Qal‘eh Kareh, and Shahrak-e Karreh Shahbāzī) is a village in Charam Rural District, in the Central District of Charam County, Kohgiluyeh and Boyer-Ahmad Province, Iran. At the 2006 census, its population was 2,186, in 406 families.

References 

Populated places in Charam County